Nigeria competed at the 2011 World Championships in Athletics from August 27 to September 4 in Daegu, South Korea.

Team selection

A team of 17 athletes was
announced to represent the country
in the event.
The team was be led by "Africa track queen" Blessing Okagbare competing in the 100m 4 × 100 m and Long Jump events.
However, the IAAF has rejected the USA-born duo of sprinter, Gloria Asumnu and quarter-miler, Ibukun Blessing Mayungbe as eligible athletes to compete for Nigeria at the 13th IAAF World Championships in Athletics.

The final team on the entry list comprises the names of 14 athletes.  After a protest by the Athletics Federation of Nigeria, Gloria Asumnu was declared eligible to start competing for Nigeria and participated in the Women's 4 x 100 metres relay event.

The following athletes appeared on the preliminary Entry List, but not on the Official Start List of the specific event, resulting in a total number of 15 competitors:

Results

Men

Women

References

External links
Official local organising committee website
Official IAAF competition website

Nations at the 2011 World Championships in Athletics
World Championships in Athletics
Nigeria at the World Championships in Athletics